Diplomat’s Folly is a 1951 thriller mystery novel by the British writer Henry Wade. Wade was a key writer during the Golden Age of Detective Fiction. The plot follows a traditional Country House mystery forumala following a murder.

Synopsis
While working at the British Embassy in Paris, a promising diplomat had a relationship with an attractive Frenchwoman. His indiscreetness led to information about the upcoming visit of the King to Paris, potentially putting the monarch's life in danger. Some time later her brother blackmails him with the letters. He enlists an old friend to help him.

References

Bibliography
 Reilly, John M. Twentieth Century Crime & Mystery Writers. Springer, 2015.

1951 British novels
Novels by Henry Wade
British mystery novels
British detective novels
British crime novels
British thriller novels
Constable & Co. books
Novels set in Paris
Novels set in England